Roper Gulf Regional Council is a local government area of the Northern Territory, Australia.

History
In October 2006 the Northern Territory Government announced the reform of local government areas. The intention of the reform was to improve and expand the delivery of services to towns and communities across the Northern Territory by establishing eleven new shires. The Roper-Gulf Shire was created on 1 July 2008 as were the remaining ten shires. On 1 January 2014, the Shire was renamed to Roper Gulf Regional Council.

Elections for the Councillors in the Region were held on 25 October 2008.

Most of the area of the Council was previously unincorporated, but it absorbed several small LGAs on incorporation:
 Borroloola Community
 Numbulwar Numburindi Community
 Nyirranggulung Mardrulk Ngadberre Regional Council
 Yugul Mangi Community
 Mataranka Community
 Jilkminggan Community
 Jodetluk Community

Wards
The Roper Gulf Regional Council is divided into 5 wards, which is governed by 13 Councillors across four wards:
 Never Never Ward          (3)
 Numbulwar Numburindi Ward (2)
 Nyirranggulung Ward       (3)
 South West Gulf Ward      (3)
 Yugul Mangi Ward          (2)

Localities and communities
Land within the Roper Gulf Shire was divided in 2007 into bounded areas for the purpose of creating an address for a property.  Most  bounded areas are called "localities" while those associated with aboriginal communities are called "communities".

Localities
Arnold	
Birdum	
Beswick Creek
Borroloola	
Calvert	
Daly Waters
Elsey	
Flying Fox	
Gulung Mardrulk	
Larrimah	
Limmen	
Mcarthur	
Nitmiluk	
Numburindi	
Pellew Islands
Sturt Plateau	 	 
Mataranka	
Wilton

Communities
Barunga
Beswick
Bulman Weemol
Jilkminggan
Miniyerri
Ngukurr
Numbulwar
Robinson River

References

External links
Roper Gulf Shire website
Map of LGAs
Policy details
Map of Roper Gulf Shire with ward and property divisions
Map of Roper Gulf Shire with ward area figures

Local government areas of the Northern Territory
Katherine Region